Hani Naboulse (born 24 January 1994) is a former Palestinian footballer who played as a defender.

He started playing football when he was 12 years old and living in Kokkedal at that time.

References

Living people
1994 births
Palestinian footballers
Palestine international footballers
Association football defenders
Lyngby Boldklub players
IF Skjold Birkerød players